Leonardo Salgado is an Argentinean palaeontologist with a special interest in dinosaurs of the Cretaceous period and other investigations of the palaeobiology of fossil bearing geological formations. Salgado is the leading or coauthor of several taxa, notably the large carnivorous species, Giganotosaurus carolinii, discovered in Patagonia.

References 

Argentine paleontologists